U.S.U.R.A. was an Italian electronic dance music group active from 1991-1998, best known for their crossover hit "Open Your Mind".

History 
U.S.U.R.A. was started by Time Records owner Giacomo Maiolini, producers Walter Cremonini and Alessandro Gilardi. The name is derived from that of Maiolini's mother, Ursula. The group is best known for the 1992-93 hit single (and later album) "Open Your Mind", featuring a dialog sample from the film Total Recall, as well as from "Solid" by Ashford & Simpson ('owh') and incorporating sampled elements from the Simple Minds song "New Gold Dream" from 1982. Its video morphs the faces of Ronald Reagan, Benito Mussolini, Joseph Stalin, Ian Paisley, Margaret Thatcher, Richard Nixon, Mary Whitehouse, and Joe McCarthy.

Discography

Studio albums

Singles

References 

Italian electronic music groups